Svetlana Piljikić (born 23 April 1981), better known as Seka Aleksić, is a Bosnian-born Serbian singer. Born in Zvornik and raised near Šabac, she rose to prominence in 2002 with her debut album Idealno tvoja. Aleskić has collectively released nine studio albums to date of predominately pop-folk music.

In addition to her music career, she starred in We Are Not Angels 3: Rock & Roll Strike Back (2006) and the Serbian adaptation of The Smurfs 2 (2013). Aleksić also had her own reality television show, called Moja desna ruka (2010), and has launched several clothing lines over the years. She is currently the second most followed woman from Serbia on Instagram with over two million followers.

Early life 
Svetlana Aleksić was born on 23 April 1981 in Zvornik, SFR Yugoslavia to a Bosnian Serb father, Milorad Aleksić, and a Bosniak mother, Ibrima. Her parents divorced when she was seven years old. She stated that she was exposed to scenes of domestic violence from her father as a child. During the Bosnian War, Aleksić fled to Serbia with her mother and older brother. They initially lived in Banja Koviljača before eventually settling down in the village of Lipolist near Šabac a year later.

Career 
Due to struggling financial situation in the family, Aleksić became a working singer from early years. At the age of 19, she moved to Switzerland where she started performing alongside a band. Seka rose to prominence in 2002 by winning at the folk music festival "Moravski biseri" in Ćuprija with the song "Idealno tvoja". It was followed with the release of her debut album of the same name under Grand Production. Her subsequent albums, Balkan (2003) and Dođi i uzmi me (2005), spawned regional hits such as "Crno i zlatno", "Sviđa mi se tvoja devojka" and "Svi tvoji milioni". Aleksić made her on-screen debut starring in the 2006 comedy film by Srđan Dragojević, called We Are Not Angels 3: Rock & Roll Strike Back. Her third album Kraljica was released in November 2007. Selling in 300,000 copies, it became that year's best-selling album by a Serbian artist. Kraljica produced popular songs like "Aspirin" and "Posldenji let".

While promoting her fifth release, titled Slučajni partneri (2009), Aleksić announced her first solo concert in the Belgrade Arena. It was held on 24 October 2010 to 15,000 people. In 2010, she also appeared on her own reality competition show called Moja desna ruka, which aired on TV Prva documenting the search for her new assistant. Following the release of Lom in April 2012, she embarked on a tour across Europe and the United States. Aleksić provided the voiceover for the character Vexy in the Serbian adaptation of The Smurfs 2 (2013). She posed for the cover of the May 2014 issue of the Serbian Playboy magazine. In May 2015, Aleksić released Lek za spavanje through City Records, featuring hits such as the title song, "Crveni ruž" and "Ti se hrani mojim bolom". Her eighth album "Koma" was subsequently released in April 2017. It provided songs like "Evo" and "Ti i ja smo par". Koma was followed with her second concert in the Belgrade Arena on 14 April 2018.

In May 2022, Aleksić released album Bioskop. She announced her tenth studio album, titled Disco Seka, with its lead single "Priđi ako smeš" in December 2022.

Personal life 
Aleksić married former kickboxer Veljko Piljkić on 12 September 2010. They have to sons - Jovan ( 24 September 2016) and Jakov ( 22 January 2020). Both were conceived through In vitro fertilisation. Seka and her family reside in Stara Pazova.

She practices Eastern Orthodox Christianity and is vocal about her religiousness. In spite of her beliefs, in August 2022, Piljkić condemned religious rallies against EuroPride in Belgrade and showed her support for the LGBT community in Serbia.

Charity work 
In December 2011, she held a benefit concert in Zenica for a young man, named Kemal Kremić, who was diagnosed with leukemia. The event reportedly raised €40,000.

Following the 2014 Southeast Europe floods, Aleksić supplied shelters in Serbia with food and hygiene products.

Discography 
Studio albums
Idealno tvoja (2002)
Balkan (2003)
Dođi i uzmi me (2005)
Kraljica (2007)
Slučajni partneri (2009)
Lom (2012)
Lek za spavanje (2015)
Koma (2017)
Bioskop (2022)

Filmography

See also 
 Music of Serbia
 Turbo-folk

References

External links 

Living people
1981 births
21st-century Bosnia and Herzegovina women singers
Bosnia and Herzegovina turbo-folk singers
Bosnia and Herzegovina people of Bosniak descent
Bosnia and Herzegovina people of Serbian descent
People from Zvornik
Grand Production artists
Bosnia and Herzegovina emigrants to Serbia
Yugoslav Wars refugees
Refugees in Serbia
21st-century Serbian women singers
Serbian turbo-folk singers
Serbian folk-pop singers
Serbian people of Bosniak descent